Jan Janszoon van Hoorn's expedition of 1633 was a privateering voyage against colonial Honduras and Yucatan. Commissioned by the Dutch West India Company, it resulted in various casualties, the sacking of Campeachy, and the sacking and burning of Trujillo, leaving this latter villa defenceless for the rest of the 1630s.

Prelude 

Sometime after Piet Heyn's 1628 capture of the silver fleet, this admiral advised the Heren  (the WIC's governing body) to commission a raid of Trujillo. They first acted on Heyn's advice on 4 June 1630, instructing Jan Booneter and Adriaen Pater to surprise the silver fleet at port in Trujillo, if they found this feasible. Said project proving abortive, the Heren  next (14 June 1632) instructed Galeyn von Stapels to chart the coast and waters of the Bay of Campeachy, the Yucatan Peninsula, and the Bay of Honduras. Later that year, on 2 November, the Heren  instructed Jan van Hoorn to sail for the Bay of Honduras, where he was to sack Trujillo.

Expedition

Departure 
Hoorn set sail from Pernambuco two hours after sunrise on 26 April 1633, anchoring at off Bridgetown on 20 May. The company watered here for seven days before setting off due west. On 18 June, they sighted the eastern tip of Puerto Rico. On 5 July, they dropped anchor off Little Cayman. Two days later, the fleet were joined by the Nachtegael and the Gijsselingh, which had been cruising for prizes off Cape Cruz (Cuba) since 29 June. The yachts brought the expedition's first prize, a small merchantman laden with 1,037 hides, three small chests of sugar, and 144 jars of honey. They set off for the Bay of Honduras sometime during 710 July.

Honduras 

The fleet sighted the Honduras mainland on 11 July. They spent the next 3 days charting the coastal waters, taking care to remain hidden from sentinels at the Santa Barbara Fortress. On 15 July, two hours past midday, the fleet's ships finally entered Trujillo's harbour. The Fortress immediately engaged the ships, resulting in the campaign's first casualtiesfour deaths in the Zutphen. In the meantime, the fleet's yachts and sloops made their way west of the city, disembarking the soldiers at the mouth of the Santo Antonio Creek. This column now marched east, and in short order reached the Fortress, which they took after outgunning its men. The Fortress fallen, the city was theirs within two hours. The men rested in Trujillo that night, spending the next morning ransacking the city's residences.

Trujillo's ransom paid, Hoorn and company departed on 21 July.

Campeachy 

Hoorn's fleet had a hard time circumnavigating the Yucatan Peninsula, their nautical charts proving inaccurate. They sighted Cozumel on 25 July, and Cape Catoche on 1 August, where they watered. Here, they surprised an unladen frigate, from whose crew they learnt of a naval squadron cruising for them, with instructions to transport them to S. Martinho (Spain?). They nonetheless proceeded, finally sighting Campeachy on the afternoon of 11 August. The ships anchored some four or five leagues east-northeast of the city.

Hoorn's fleet finally set off on the morning of 24 August.

Return 
On 18 September, the fleet came eight or nine leagues due south of Pan de Matanzas (Cuba). At this point, some of the company wished to cruise for prizes. Consequently, the Otter and the sloops stayed behind, with the rest of the fleet proceeding to open ocean via the Old Bahama Channel. The latter arrived in Texel on 11 November.

Aftermath 

Having split off from the main fleet on 18 September 1633, Cornelis Jol lead the Otter, Nachtegael, and the Gijsselingh in a privateering voyage across the Greater Antilles. He returned to Texel on 6 June 1634, with at least three prizes.

In the last quarter of 1633, the governor of colonial Yucatan requisitioned funds from local treasuries of the province's majority-Mayan reduccion or encomienda settlements, under pretext of the funds' being surpluses, and diverted these towards bolstering Campeachy's defences. It has been suggested that the appropriation was prompted (at least partially) by the participation of two of the province's Mayan residents in the city's sacking.

Fernando Centeno Maldonado, governor of colonial Campeachy, was (belatedly) stripped of his office in 1636, purportedly or partially due to Hoorn's successful sacking.

The loss of the Santa Barbara Fortress's artillery, and especially of its ten cannons, left Trujillo precariously defenceless until the latter half of 1639, when the Fortress was finally resupplied with harquebuses.

Legacy 

The expedition is deemed to have helped bring about the 'destruction of Spanish naval power' in the Caribbean. Hoorn's capture of Campeachy, in particular, has been described as 'one of the most courageous acts committed by so few people [up to 1633].' Hoorn, however, is thought to have been disappointed, his expedition having 'not contributed much' to the WIC's treasury.

It has been suggested that Hoorn's sacking of Campeachy was so traumatising to residents that it shortly morphed into a local legend which, over generations, was romanticised. For instance, the event is prominently featured in El filibustero: Leyenda del siglo , an 18411842 serial novel by Justo Sierra O'Reilly, which narrates the tragic romance of Conchita (of Campeachy) and her father's killer, Diego el Mulato.

It has been suggested that the fleet's two Mayan pilots participated in Campeachy's sacking voluntarily, which event has been regarded as a precedent-setting example of 17th century opposition by the province's Amerindian residents to Spanish temporal and spiritual hegemony.

Notes

Citations

References 

 
 
 
 
 
 
 
 
 
 
 
 
 
 
 
 
 
 

17th century in Europe
Thirty Years' War
17th-century conflicts
Warfare of the Early Modern period